Leiognathus is a genus of marine ray-finned fishes, ponyfishes from the family Leiognathidae. They are native to the Indian Ocean and the western Pacific Ocean. They are sometimes known as silverbellies.

Species
There are currently 7 recognized species in this genus:

 Leiognathus berbis (Valenciennes, 1835) (Berber ponyfish)
 Leiognathus brevirostris (Valenciennes, 1835) (Shortnose ponyfish)
 Leiognathus equulus (Forsskål, 1775) (Common ponyfish)
 Leiognathus longispinis (Valenciennes, 1835) (Longspine ponyfish)
 Leiognathus parviceps (Valenciennes, 1835)
 Leiognathus robustus Sparks & Dunlap, 2004
 Leiognathus striatus P. S. B. R. James & Badrudeen, 1991

References

 
Leiognathidae
Taxa named by Bernard Germain de Lacépède
Fish of the Indian Ocean
Fish of the Pacific Ocean
Bioluminescent fish